Helix melanostoma is a species of air-breathing land snail, a terrestrial pulmonate gastropod mollusk in the subfamily Helicinae of the family Helicidae, the typical snails.

Appearance
Colour of the shell greyish or almost white. The inner margin of the mouth brown or violet. Size about 38 × 36 to 28 × 33 mm.

Distribution
 Helix melanostoma occurs in Algeria, Tunisia and South France

References

 Bank, R. A.; Neubert, E. (2017). Checklist of the land and freshwater Gastropoda of Europe. Last update: July 16, 2017

External links

 http://www.animalbase.uni-goettingen.de/zooweb/servlet/AnimalBase/home/species?id=1602

Helix (gastropod)
Gastropods described in 1801